William Tibertus McCarty, C.Ss.R. (August 11, 1889 – September 14, 1972) was an American prelate of the Roman Catholic Church. A Redemptorist, he served as bishop of the Diocese of Rapid City in South Dakota from 1948 to 1969.  He previously served as an auxiliary bishop of the Archdiocese for the Military Services, USA, from 1943 to 1947.

Biography

Early life 
William Tibertus McCarty was born in Crossingville, Crawford County, Pennsylvania, to Timothy and Margaret (née Burns) McCarty. He was educated at the seminaries of the Congregation of the Most Holy Redeemer, more commonly known as the Redemptorists, in North East, Maryland; Ilchester, Maryland; and Esopus, New York. He made his profession as a member of the Redemptorists on August 2, 1910 in Ilchester.

Priesthood 
He was later ordained to the priesthood in Esopus on June 10, 1915.

McCarty then returned to Pennsylvania and taught at St. Mary's College in North East from 1916 to 1917. He taught at Mount St. Alphonsus Seminary in Esopus (1918-1926), where he also served as prefect of studies (1921-1930). From 1930 to 1933, he was an assistant rector at the Mission Church in Boston, Massachusetts. He then returned to Mount St. Alphonsus as its rector, serving between 1933 and 1939. From 1939 to 1943, McCarty served as provincial of the Redemptorists' Eastern Province. During his tenure as provincial, he inaugurated fourteen Redemptorist foundations in the United States, Puerto Rico, and Brazil.

Auxiliary Bishop for the Military Services, USA 
On January 2, 1943, McCarty was appointed Auxiliary Bishop for the Archdiocese for the Military Services, USA and Titular Bishop of Anaea by Pope Pius XII. He received his episcopal consecration on the following January 25 from Archbishop Francis Spellman, with Bishops Molloy and O'Hara, C.S.C., serving as co-consecrators.

Coadjutor Bishop and Bishop of Rapid City 
He was named Coadjutor Bishop of the Diocese of Rapid City, South Dakota, on April 10, 1947. McCarty later succeeded the late John Jeremiah Lawler as the fourth Bishop of Rapid City upon the latter's death on March 11, 1948. He attended the Second Vatican Council between 1962 and 1965.

After twenty-one years of service, McCarty retired as Bishop of Rapid City on September 11, 1969; he was appointed Titular Bishop of Rotdon by Pope Paul VI on the same date. He resigned his titular see on January 13, 1971. He died in 1972, aged 83.

See also

 Catholic Church hierarchy
 Catholic Church in the United States
 Historical list of the Catholic bishops of the United States
 Insignia of Chaplain Schools in the US Military
 List of Catholic bishops of the United States
 List of Catholic bishops of the United States: military service
 Lists of patriarchs, archbishops, and bishops
 Military chaplain
 Religious symbolism in the United States military
 United States military chaplains

References

External links
 Archdiocese for the Military Services, USA, official website
 Archdiocese for the Military Services of the United States. GCatholic.org. Retrieved 2010-08-20.

Episcopal succession

1889 births
1972 deaths
People from Crawford County, Pennsylvania
Mount St. Alphonsus Seminary alumni
People from Rapid City, South Dakota
Participants in the Second Vatican Council
Chaplains
Redemptorist bishops
American military chaplains
Roman Catholic bishops of Rapid City
20th-century American Roman Catholic titular bishops
Catholics from Pennsylvania
20th-century Roman Catholic bishops in the United States